Melaleuca leiocarpa, commonly known as pungent honey-myrtle, is a plant in the myrtle family, Myrtaceae and is native to arid areas in parts of South Australia and Western Australia. It is an erect or branching shrub distinguished by its prickly foliage, yellowish flowers and, for a melaleuca, unusually large, smooth, roughly spherical fruits.

Description

The stamens are yellow-lemon in colour, in five bundles around the flower, each bundle containing 11 to 22 stamens. Flowers usually appear between August and December and are followed by fruit which are spherical, woody capsules,  diameter.

Taxonomy and naming
Melaleuca leiocarpa was first formally described in 1876 by Ferdinand von Mueller in "Fragmenta phytographiae Australiae". The specific epithet (leiocarpa) is derived from the ancient Greek words λεῖος (leîos) meaning "smooth" and καρπός (karpós) meaning "fruit", referring to the smooth fruits.

Distribution and habitat
Melaleuca leiocarpa occurs in the Gawler Ranges and northern Eyre Peninsula in South Australia. It is also found in arid areas of eastern Western Australia including the Avon Wheatbelt, Central Ranges, Coolgardie, Gascoyne, Geraldton Sandplains, Great Victoria Desert, Murchison, Pilbara and Yalgoo biogeographic regions. It grows in rocky lateritic soils and red sand on hillsides, outcrops and sandplains.

Conservation status
Melaleuca leiocarpa is listed as "not threatened" by the Government of Western Australia Department of Parks and Wildlife.

Uses

Horticulture
This melaleuca is rarely cultivated but is a showy shrub in full flower and is suited to most soils. It is hardy in well-drained conditions but requires full sun.

Essential oils
The oils from the leaves of this shrub are mostly monoterpenoids.

References

Flora of South Australia
Flora of Western Australia
leiocarpa
Myrtales of Australia
Plants described in 1876
Taxa named by Ferdinand von Mueller